Lyle Latell (born Lyle Zeiem; April 9, 1904 – October 24, 1967) was an American character actor. He was perhaps best known for playing Pat Patton in the Dick Tracy film series.

Biography 
Latell was born Lyle Zeiem on April 1904 in Elma, Iowa. He married Mary Foy in 1947. He died in October 1967 of a heart attack in Hollywood, California, at the age of 63. He is interred in San Fernando Mission Cemetery.

Filmography

Film

Television

References

External links 

Rotten Tomatoes profile

1904 births
1967 deaths
People from Iowa
Male actors from Iowa
American male film actors
American male television actors
20th-century American male actors